Sam Shearon (born 15 March 1978), also known under the pseudonym and credited / published also as Mister Sam Shearon is a British dark artist born in Liverpool, England. Specialising in horror and science-fiction, his work often includes elements inspired by vintage tales of monsters and madmen, dark futures, post apocalyptic genres including cyberpunk and industrial wastelands and classic literature including H.P.Lovecraft's The Call of Cthulhu, Oscar Wilde's The Picture of Dorian Gray and the modern classics Clive Barker's Hellraiser and the Books of Blood all of which he has fully illustrated.

Shearon's main influences stem from ancient cultures, the occult, industrial/art/revolution-eras, the supernatural, the paranormal, cryptozoology and the unexplained. Shearon has created covers for comic books and graphic novels including Clive Barker's HELLRAISER, Judge Dredd, The X-Files, Mars Attacks, 30 Days of Night, Angel, KISS, and Clive Barker's Books of Blood, Stan Lee's 'Lucky Man' and album sleeve artwork and merchandise designs for some of the biggest names in rock, metal and industrial music, such as Godhead, Ministry, Rob Zombie,  Iron Maiden, Slayer, H.I.M, KISS, Doyle Wolfgang von Frankenstein, Powerman 5000, Biohazard, American Head Charge, Rammstein, Jason Charles Miller , Fear Factory , Orgy, Fitler, Cradle of filth, and Kill Devil Hill.

Biography
Shearon studied at the University of Leeds in the College of Art & Design, West Yorkshire, England. He was awarded a Bachelor of Arts Degree with Honours in 2000 for Visual Communication. Shortly after, he went on to become a qualified Art teacher gaining a Post Graduate Certificate in Education from Huddersfield University.
His first solo exhibition entitled "A Walk on the Darkside" in 2003, featured forty five pieces of his original artwork including  demonic statues, biomechanical monsters and giant canvases depicting images of horror and the macabre.
The exhibition was featured in various national newspapers including The Daily Telegraph as well as BBC Radio One and live interviews on BBC Radio Leeds North. The show attracted protests and boycotts over its inclusion of animal bones, and the mutilation and disembowelment of children's toys, but the show was extended to six weeks due to popular demand.

His work has been described by the British press as "bizarre", "grotesque" "gruesome", and "groundbreaking". Shearon is known for his work in the field of cryptozoology, most notably for compiling artists impressions, of the Beast of Lytham from eyewitness accounts. Shearon's cryptozoological art was on display at the 2005 Weird Weekend, an annual conference at the Centre for Fortean Zoology. His work can be found in publications of the Fortean Times, Paranormal Magazine as well as the cover artwork for IDW Comics for the Angel series, 30 Days of Night, The X-Files, Alan Roberts Wire Hangers, H.P.Lovecraft's The Call of Cthulhu, KISS, Mars Attacks, Judge Dredd, Hellraiser and Clive Barker's Books of Bloodand also horror magazine Fangoria's Trinity of Terrors. Shearon provided cover art for the official collectors programme to a Halloween weekend event featuring the rock/metal band Slipknot depicting a portrayal of their lead singer Corey Taylor.

Shearon has created artwork for a variety of rock and metal music related clients including Jason Charles Miller, Godhead: At the Edge of the World, Mina Caputo, Ryan Oldcastle, HIM, Shane Gibson's stOrk featuring Thomas Lang, A Pale Horse Named Death – (featuring members of both Type O Negative and Life of Agony), Iron Maiden, Fear Factory, Rammstein, Biohazard, Black Water Rising, Ministry, Kill Devil Hill, Powerman 5000, American Head Charge and Rob Zombie. Shearon's artwork can also be found in the form of graphics on the bodies of guitars, carry cases, drum skins and merchandise. Clients include Pro Tone Pedals, Coffin Case, ESP Guitars, Dean Guitars and Schecter Guitar Research.

Artwork credits

Music albums
2008: Godhead –  At the Edge of the World
2008: Keith Caputo –  Dass Berdache
2008: Ryan Oldcastle – Patience Seeds
2009: Black Water Rising – Black Water Rising
2009: Godhead –  The Early Years
2010: Rob Zombie –  Hellbilly Deluxe 2
2010: stOrk –  stOrk
2010: A Pale Horse Named Death –  And Hell Will Follow Me
2011: Indestructible Noise Command –  Heaven Sent... Hellbound
2011: PLUG-IN –  HIJACK
2011: Crowned By Fire –  Prone To Destroy
2012: Jason Charles Miller – Uncountry
2012: Biohazard –  Reborn in Defiance
2012: September Mourning –  Melancholia
2012: WRENCH –  Dry Heaves & Tears
2012: Jason Charles Miller – Natural Born Killer
2012: The Dark –  Teenage Angst
2012: Arise in Chaos –  Civilization Decay
2013: American Head Charge –  Shoot
2013: A Pale Horse Named Death –  Lay My Soul to Waste
2013: stOrk –  Broken Pieces
2013: Crowned By Fire –  Space Music For Cave People
2013: Ministry –  From Beer To Eternity
2013: Kill Devil Hill –  Revolution Rise
2014: Ministry –  Last Tangle In Paris
2014: Powerman 5000 –  Builders of the Future
2014: Judgemental –  Empires Fall
2014: Indestructible Noise Command – Black Hearse Serenade
2015: SOSRA –  DEMO-Lition
2015: RUNE –  Self-Titled
2015: Karnival Korpus –  Lynch
2015: KREEP –  One Nation Under
2015: Despite Loyalty –  Come Burn With Me
2016: Arise in Chaos –  Terminal Cognition
2016: Anti-clone –  The Root of Man
2016: American Head Charge –  Tango Umbrella
2016: King Creature –  Down in Flames
2016: The Greatest Fear –  Title TBD
2016: Karnival Korpus –  HOGOS / House of Glass On Stone
2016: Arise in Chaos – Terminal Cognition
2016: Karnival Korpus –  The Liar
2016: Flatliner –  Pale Blue
2017: La Fin Absolute Du Mond –  Killing The Host
2017: King Creature –  Volume One
2017: INVIDIA –  As The Sun Sleeps
2017: Meatspace –  Title TBD
2017: Motograter –  Desolation
2017: A Killer's Confession –  Unbroken
2017: DOYLE –  Doyle II: As We Die
2017: Mark Slaughter – Halfway There
2017: Northern Light Orchestra – Star of the East
2018: MINISTRY – AMERIKKKANT
2018: JASON CHARLES MILLER – IN THE WASTELAND
2018: Grim Demise –  Watchers of the Dying Earth
2019: A Pale Horse Named Death – When The World Becomes Undone
2019: Orgy (band)Orgy
2019: Last Machine Operation - Invitation to the World
2020: Jason Charles Miller - FROM THE WRECKAGE PART ONE
2020: FILTER - MURICA
2020: King Tuts Tomb - TIME TO GO
2021: Jason Charles Miller - FROM THE WRECKAGE PART TWO
2022: KILL DEVIL HILL – TBA
2022: FILTER - For The Beaten
2023: Jason Charles Miller - Wasted Years

Guitar graphics
ESP Guitars
2008: Cobweb & Redburn TWO EC Graphic guitars
2009: Clockwork Zombie Series 1 & 2 (SOLD OUT) SIX graphic guitars models-( EC, Viper, EX)
2013: Vampire Bio-Tech THREE graphic guitars models-(EC, Viper, M).
Cort Guitars
2008: Steamborg Assinator - acoustic / hard body / engraved. (As used by Emmanuel Nwamadi on the television show The Voice UK).
2008: Cort X series (X-2 SA, X-6 SA) 
Dean Guitars
2011: Dave Mustaine – MEGADETH American Flag – 'Mako' – 'GLORY' Signature Acoustic Guitar Graphic.
2011: Michael Angelo Batio – Light-Speed – Guitar Graphic.
2011: Dimebag 'X-RAY' – Razorback – Guitar Graphic.
Schecter Guitar Research
2012: Gary Holt – 'Exodus' / 'Slayer' – Flying 'V' Guitar Graphic.

Guitar cases – CoffinCase
CoffinCase
2009: Maila Nurmi 'VAMPIRA' Memorial Portrait CoffinCase.
2009: TKL Cases: 'The Beast'.

Comics and graphic novels
IDW Publishing
2009: 'ANGEL' – Landau/Lynch/Urru – comic (Issue 24 – 3 X Limited Edition cover artworks).
2010: 'Wire Hangers' Alan Robert comic (Issue 4 – cover artwork).
2010: 'Wire Hangers' Alan Robert Graphic Novel / Full series collection. (cover artwork).
2011: '30 Days of Night' – Infestation 2 – 'Cthulhu-styled' cover.
2012: 'The Secret Battles of Genghis Khan' – cover.
2012: 'H.P.Lovecraft' – 'The Call of Cthulhu and other Mythos Tales' – Cover & 20+ Illustrations.
2012: 'Oscar Wilde' – 'The Picture of Dorian Gray' – Cover & 20+ Illustrations.
2012: 'KISS' – 'Kiss Girls' – two variant covers.
2012: 'KISS' – 'Kiss Meets the Phantom of the Park' – Cover Artwork.
2012: 'KISS' – Greatest Hits Volume 3 – (cover artwork).
2013: 'KISS' – Greatest Hits Volume 4 – (cover artwork).
2013: 'KISS' – Greatest Hits Volume 5 – (cover artwork).
2013: 'Mars Attacks' – 'Beast and the Beauty'. (cover artwork).
2013: 'The X-Files' – Classics Volume 1 – (Cover Artwork).
2013: 'The X-Files' – Classics Volume 2 – (Cover Artwork).
2013: 'The Other Dead' – Issue 3 – (Cover Artwork).
2014: 'The Other Dead' – Issue 5 – (Cover Artwork).
2014: 'The Other Dead' – Issue 6 – (Cover Artwork).
2014: 'The X-Files' – Classics Volume 3 – (Cover Artwork).
2014: 'The X-Files' – Classics Volume 4 – (Cover Artwork).
2014: 'The X-Files' – Annual – (Exorcist) – (Cover Artwork).
2015: 'Judge Dredd' – Classics – (The Four Dark Judges - Four Issues) – (Cover Artwork).
2015: 'The X-Files' – Annual – (Ground Zero) – (Cover Artwork).
2015: 'Thunder Agents' – (Cover Artwork).
2016: 'Richard Matheson' – Master of Horror – (Cover Artwork).
2017: 'Aleister Arcane' – Collection – (Cover Artwork).
BOOM! Studios
2014: Clive Barker's 'Hellraiser' – Bestiary Issue 1 – (Cover Artwork).

Madefire / Seraphim Ink
2014: Clive Barker's 'Books of Blood' – Issue 1: 'The book of Blood' (Full Interior & Cover Artwork).

IMAGE comics
2022: 'Liam Sharp's STARHENGE' - issue SIX - book one – (Cover Artwork).

Opus Publishing
2022: 'Cradle of Filth' - issue FIVE - (Cover Artwork).

Merchandise and tour shirt designs
2007: Iron Maiden: 'Somewhere Back in Time' World Tour Scarab Image.
2007: HIM : Various T-shirt Designs.
2008: Godhead : At the Edge of the World T-shirt Designs.
2008: Keith Caputo : Hearts Blood / Das Berdache.
2009: Cradle of Filth : Various T-shirt Designs.
2010: Fear Factory : Various T-shirt Designs.
2010: Jason Charles Miller : The Devil T-shirt Design.
2010: Rob Zombie : Hellbilly Deluxe 2 – Portrait / T-shirt Design.
2011: A Pale Horse Named Death : And Hell Will Follow Me : T-shirt Design.
2011: Rammstein – Tour Merchandise.
2012: Rammstein – Tour Merchandise.
2012: Many of Odd Nature – Tour Merchandise.
2012: Slaves on Dope – Summer Tour Merchandise.
2012: Jason Charles Miller : Natural Born Killer.
2013: American Head Charge
2013: A Pale Horse Named Death : Lay My Soul to Waste : T-shirt Design.
2016: Jason Charles Miller : Brother of Bigfoot.
2016: Jason Charles Miller : Child of the Chupacabra.
2018: Jason Charles Miller : In The Wasteland.
2020: Jason Charles Miller : From The Wreckage.

Other credits
2007: Keith Caputo : European Tour Poster for 'Hearts Blood on your Dawn'.
2008: Keith Caputo : European Tour Poster for 'A Fondness for Hometown Scars'.
2008: SCUZZ – Sky network Rock/Metal music channel.
2009: FANGORIA : 'Trinity of Terrors' 3 Day Halloween event in Las Vegas – Featuring Slipknot: Programme/booklet cover artwork.
2010: Devolution Magazine : Official Cover logo.
2010: Monsters of Comedy : Tour Poster/Merch Designs : Tour fronted by Jason Rouse.
2011: A Pale Horse Named Death & Seventh Void : European Tour Poster for their debut album release.
2013: Zulu Tattoo L.A. : 'Zulu Lounge' Charity Event – Flyers / Posters / Banners / Portraits / T-shirt designs.
2014: Ministry : 'NEW DAWN' Logo Design.
2015: Pandie James 'Seraphim Song' Book Cover Design.
2017: STAN LEE's POW ENTERTAINMENT - LUCKY MAN TV Show story boards and art direction.
2018: Slayer (band) - Final World Tour : Tour Poster Designs.
2019: Slayer (band) - Final World Tour : Tour Poster Designs.

References

External links
 

1978 births
Living people
English artists
Science fiction artists
Horror artists